Lennart, Prince Bernadotte, Count of Wisborg (born Prince Lennart, Duke of Småland; 8 May 1909 – 21 December 2004) was a Swedish-German landscaper, filmmaker, photographer and was a grandson of King Gustaf V of Sweden. He was also the eldest great-grandchild of King George I of Greece.

He was born at the Royal Palace in Stockholm, to Prince Wilhelm, Duke of Södermanland, and Grand Duchess Maria Pavlovna of Russia. At birth Bernadotte was a Swedish prince and was titled Duke of Småland. In 1932, he married Karin Nissvandt, an unequal marriage, and thereafter ceased to be a Swedish dynast. Thus, he was called Mr. Bernadotte as a result. Nineteen years after he lost his Swedish royal titles, he was given titles of nobility in Luxembourg.

He published two memoirs: Käre prins, godnatt (1977) and Mainau min medelpunkt (1995).

Title

Under the Swedish Act of Succession, a prince or princess marrying without the consent of the monarch and government forfeits the right of succession for themselves and their descendants. In a new policy adopted in the case of Lennart Bernadotte, they were also forbidden to use their titles and told to use the surname of Bernadotte. By his marriage on 11 March 1932 Prince Lennart consequently, as far as Swedish records were concerned, was to be called Mr. Lennart Bernadotte.

He considered himself for several decades subjected to very cruel treatment from the Royal Court of Sweden due to his first marriage, and his wife developed a worsening psychosis from it which eventually led to their divorce in 1971.

Beginning in 1892, Swedish princes who lost their succession rights received noble titles conferred by other reigning monarchs. On 2 July 1951, for himself, his wife and his marital descendants, Bernadotte was admitted by Grand Duchess Charlotte (head of state at the time) into the nobility of Luxembourg as Count of Wisborg and in that conferral was also called Gustaf Lennart Nicolas Paul Prince Bernadotte.
Counts of Wisborg are considered to be part of the Swedish unintroduced nobility.

King Carl XVI Gustaf of Sweden, who lost the right to confer Swedish noble titles in the new constitution of 1974, still retains the prerogative to restore royal titles, but has chosen not to do so.

Career
In 1944 Bernadotte portrayed the young Crown Prince Carl of Sweden and Norway in the historical film Prince Gustaf, Bernadotte's only screen acting role. He served as head of the Sveriges Scoutförbund (Scouting Association of Sweden) from 1948 to 1951

Lennart Bernadotte concentrated his energy on his estate on the island of Mainau in Lake Constance, Germany, where he died, and on his charitable fund, the Lennart Bernadotte Stiftung. He was considered a major gardening and landscaping talent and expert and turned his island into a popular tourist attraction.

He received the Eduard Rhein Ring of Honor from the German Eduard Rhein Foundation in 1996.

Family
In London on 11 March 1932 Bernadotte married firstly Karin Emma Louise Nissvandt (7 July 1911 – 9 September 1991). They had four children before divorcing in December 1971: Birgitta, Marie-Louise, Jan (9 January 1941 – 1 September 2021), and Cecilia.

In Mainau on 29 April 1972 Bernadotte married Sonja Anita Maria Haunz (7 May 1944 – 21 October 2008). They had five children: Bettina, Björn, Catherine, Christian, and Diana.

Bernadotte died in 2004. His remains, and four years later those of his second wife, were interred in a crypt under the palace chapel on Mainau. His first wife's remains were buried in his father's grave in Flen.

Honours and arms

Orders and decorations 
   Knight of the Order of Charles XIII (8 May 1909)
   Commander Grand Cross of the Order of the Polar Star (10 April 1952)
   King Gustaf V's Jubilee Commemorative Medal (1928)
   King Gustaf V's Jubilee Commemorative Medal II (1948)
   Knight of the Order of Vasa

Arms

Ancestry

References

External links

1909 births
2004 deaths
Lennart 1909
Smaland
Grand Crosses with Star and Sash of the Order of Merit of the Federal Republic of Germany
Recipients of the Order of Merit of Baden-Württemberg
Disinherited European royalty
Lennart
Artists from Stockholm
Lennart
Knights of the Order of Charles XIII
Knights of the Order of Vasa
Commanders Grand Cross of the Order of the Polar Star